Taylor University College may refer to:

Taylor University College and Seminary, in Edmonton, Alberta, Canada
Taylor's University College, in Selangor, Malaysia